The 1896–97 Scottish Cup was the 24th season of Scotland's most prestigious football knockout competition. The cup was won by Rangers when they beat Dumbarton (by then a lower division club, and playing in their last major final to date) in the final the second Hampden Park by a 5–1 scoreline to claim the trophy for the second time.

Calendar

First round

First round replay

Second round

 Match Declared Void

Second round replay

Second round second replay

Quarter-final

Quarter-final replay

Semi-finals

Final

Teams

See also
 1896–97 in Scottish football

References

RSSF Scottish Cup 96-97

1896-1897
Cup
Cup